During the 2006–07 Italian football season, Sampdoria competed in Serie A.

Season summary
Sampdoria finished 9th, which was sufficient to qualify for the Intertoto Cup. Manager Walter Novellino left at the end of the season to join Torino, and was replaced by Reggina coach Walter Mazzarri.

Kit
Sampdoria's kit was manufactured by Kappa and sponsored by Genovese energy company Edoardo Raffinerie Garrone.

First-team squad
Squad at end of season

Left club during season

Competitions

Serie A

References

U.C. Sampdoria seasons
U.C. Sampdoria